Plantar fasciitis or plantar heel pain (PHP) is a disorder of the plantar fascia, which is the connective tissue which supports the arch of the foot. It results in pain in the heel and bottom of the foot that is usually most severe with the first steps of the day or following a period of rest. Pain is also frequently brought on by bending the foot and toes up towards the shin. The pain typically comes on gradually, and it affects both feet in about one-third of cases.

The cause of plantar fasciitis is not entirely clear. Risk factors include overuse, such as from long periods of standing, an increase in exercise, and obesity. It is also associated with inward rolling of the foot, a tight Achilles tendon, and a sedentary lifestyle. It is unclear if heel spurs have a role in causing plantar fasciitis even though they are commonly present in people who have the condition. Plantar fasciitis is a disorder of the insertion site of the ligament on the bone characterized by micro tears, breakdown of collagen, and scarring. Since inflammation plays either a lesser or no role, a review proposed it be renamed plantar fasciosis. The presentation of the symptoms is generally the basis for diagnosis; with ultrasound sometimes being useful if there is uncertainty. Other conditions with similar symptoms include osteoarthritis, ankylosing spondylitis, heel pad syndrome, and reactive arthritis.

Most cases of plantar fasciitis resolve with time and conservative methods of treatment. For the first few weeks, those affected are usually advised to rest, change their activities, take pain medications, and stretch. If this is not sufficient, physiotherapy, orthotics, splinting, or steroid injections may be options. If these measures are not effective, additional measures may include extracorporeal shockwave therapy or surgery.

Between 4% and 7% of the general population has heel pain at any given time: about 80% of these are due to plantar fasciitis. Approximately 10% of people have the disorder at some point during their life. It becomes more common with age. It is unclear if one sex is more affected than the other.

Signs and symptoms
When plantar fasciitis occurs, the pain is typically sharp and usually unilateral (70% of cases). Bearing weight on the heel after long periods of rest worsens heel pain in affected individuals. Individuals with plantar fasciitis often report their symptoms are most intense during their first steps after getting out of bed or after prolonged periods of sitting. Symptoms typically improve with continued walking.  Rare, but reported symptoms include numbness, tingling, swelling, or radiating pain. Typically there are no fevers or night sweats.

If the plantar fascia is overused in the setting of plantar fasciitis, the plantar fascia can rupture. Typical signs and symptoms of plantar fascia rupture include a clicking or snapping sound, significant local swelling, and acute pain in the bottom of the foot.

Risk factors
Identified risk factors for plantar fasciitis include excessive running, standing on hard surfaces for prolonged periods, high arches of the feet, the presence of a leg length inequality, and flat feet. The tendency of flat feet to excessively roll inward during walking or running makes them more susceptible to plantar fasciitis. Obesity is seen in 70% of individuals who present with plantar fasciitis and is an independent risk factor.

Plantar fasciitis is commonly a result of some biomechanical imbalance that causes an increased amount of tension placed along the plantar fascia.

Studies consistently find a strong association between increased body mass index and plantar fasciitis in the non-athletic population. This association between weight and plantar fasciitis is not present in the athletic population. Achilles tendon tightness and inappropriate footwear have also been identified as significant risk factors.

Pathophysiology

The cause of plantar fasciitis is poorly understood and appears to have several contributing factors. The plantar fascia is a thick fibrous band of connective tissue that originates from the medial tubercle and anterior aspect of the heel bone. From there, the fascia extends along the sole of the foot before inserting at the base of the toes and supports the arch of the foot.

Plantar fasciitis is a non-inflammatory condition of the plantar fascia. Within the last decade, studies have observed microscopic anatomical changes indicating that plantar fasciitis is due to a non-inflammatory structural breakdown of the plantar fascia rather than an inflammatory process.

Many in the academic community have stated the condition should be renamed plantar fasciosis in light of these newer findings. Repetitive microtrauma (small tears) appears to cause a structural breakdown of the plantar fascia. Microscopic examination of the plantar fascia often shows myxomatous degeneration, connective tissue calcium deposits, and disorganized collagen fibers.

Disruptions in the plantar fascia's normal mechanical movement during standing and walking (known as the Windlass mechanism) place excess strain on the calcaneal tuberosity and seem to contribute to the development of plantar fasciitis. Other studies have also suggested that plantar fasciitis is not due to the inflamed plantar fascia but maybe a tendon injury involving the flexor digitorum brevis muscle located immediately deep to the plantar fascia.

Diagnosis

Plantar fasciitis is usually diagnosed by a health care provider after consideration of a person's presenting history, risk factors, and clinical examination. Palpation along the inner aspect of the heel bone on the sole may elicit tenderness during the physical examination. The foot may have limited dorsiflexion due to excessive tightness of the calf muscles or the Achilles tendon. Dorsiflexion of the foot may elicit the pain due to stretching of the plantar fascia with this motion. Diagnostic imaging studies are not usually needed to diagnose plantar fasciitis. Occasionally, a physician may decide imaging studies (such as X-rays, diagnostic ultrasound, or MRI) are warranted to rule out serious causes of foot pain.

Other diagnoses that are typically considered include fractures, tumors, or systemic disease if plantar fasciitis pain fails to respond appropriately to conservative medical treatments. Bilateral heel pain or heel pain in the context of a systemic illness may indicate a need for a more in-depth diagnostic investigation. Under these circumstances, diagnostic tests such as a CBC or serological markers of inflammation, infection, or autoimmune disease such as C-reactive protein, erythrocyte sedimentation rate, anti-nuclear antibodies, rheumatoid factor, HLA-B27, uric acid, or Lyme disease antibodies may also be obtained. Neurological deficits may prompt an investigation with electromyography to check for damage to the nerves or muscles.

An incidental finding associated with this condition is a heel spur, a small bony calcification on the calcaneus (heel bone), which can be found in up to 50% of those with plantar fasciitis. In such cases, it is the underlying plantar fasciitis that produces the heel pain, and not the spur itself. The condition is responsible for the creation of the spur though the clinical significance of heel spurs in plantar fasciitis remains unclear.

Imaging
Medical imaging is not routinely needed. It is expensive and does not typically change how plantar fasciitis is managed. When the diagnosis is not clinically apparent, lateral view X-rays of the ankle are the recommended imaging modality to assess for other causes of heel pain, such as stress fractures or bone spur development.

The plantar fascia has three fascicles-the central fascicle being the thickest at 4 mm, the lateral fascicle at 2 mm, and the medial less than a millimeter thick. In theory, plantar fasciitis becomes more likely as the plantar fascia's thickness at the calcaneal insertion increases. A thickness of more than 4.5 mm ultrasound and 4 mm on MRI are useful for diagnosis. Other imaging findings, such as thickening of the plantar aponeurosis, are nonspecific and have limited usefulness in diagnosing plantar fasciitis.

Three-phase bone scan is a sensitive modality to detect active plantar fasciitis. Furthermore, a 3-phase bone scan can be used to monitor response to therapy, as demonstrated by decreased uptake after corticosteroid injections.

Differential diagnosis
The differential diagnosis for heel pain is extensive and includes pathological entities including, but not limited to, the following: calcaneal stress fracture, septic arthritis, calcaneal bursitis, osteoarthritis, spinal stenosis involving the nerve roots of lumbar spinal nerve 5 (L5) or sacral spinal nerve 1 (S1), calcaneal fat pad syndrome, metastasized cancers from elsewhere in the body, hypothyroidism, gout, seronegative spondyloparthopathies such as reactive arthritis, ankylosing spondylitis, or rheumatoid arthritis (more likely if pain is present in both heels), plantar fascia rupture, and compression neuropathies such as tarsal tunnel syndrome or impingement of the medial calcaneal nerve.

A determination about a diagnosis of plantar fasciitis can usually be made based on a person's medical history and physical examination. When a physician suspects a fracture, infection, or some other serious underlying condition, they may order an X-ray to investigate. X-rays are unnecessary to screen for plantar fasciitis for people who stand or walk a lot at work unless imaging is otherwise indicated.

Treatment

Non-surgical
About 90% of plantar fasciitis cases improve within six months with conservative treatment, and within a year regardless of treatment.

The recommended first treatment is a 4-6 week course which combines three elements: daily stretching, daily foot taping (using a special tape around the foot for supporting the arch) and individually tailored education on choosing footwear and other ways of managing the condition.

If plantar fasciitis fails to respond to conservative treatment for at least three months, then extracorporeal shockwave therapy (ESWT) may be considered. Evidence from meta-analyses suggests significant pain relief lasts up to one year after the procedure.  However, debate about the therapy's efficacy has persisted. ESWT is performed with or without anesthesia though studies suggest giving anesthesia diminishes the procedure's effectiveness. Complications from ESWT are rare and typically benign when present. Known complications of ESWT include the development of a mild hematoma or an ecchymosis, redness around the site of the procedure, or migraine.

The third line of treatment, if shockwave therapy is not effective after around 8 weeks, is using customised foot orthoses which can offer short-term relief from pain.

Affected people use further different treatments for plantar fasciitis but many have little evidence to support their use and are not adequately studied.

Other conservative approaches include rest, massage, heat, ice, and calf-strengthening exercises, weight reduction in the overweight or obese, and nonsteroidal anti-inflammatory drugs (NSAIDs) such as aspirin or ibuprofen. The use of NSAIDs to treat plantar fasciitis is common, but their use fails to resolve the pain in 20% of people.

Corticosteroid injections are sometimes used for cases of plantar fasciitis that have proven resistant to more conservative measures. There is tentative evidence that injected corticosteroids are effective for short-term pain relief up to one month, but not after that.

Another treatment technique is known as plantar iontophoresis. This technique involves applying anti-inflammatory substances such as dexamethasone or acetic acid topically to the foot and transmitting these substances through the skin with an electric current. Some evidence supports the use of night splints for 1–3 months to relieve plantar fasciitis pain that has persisted for six months. The night splints are designed to position and maintain the ankle in a neutral position, thereby passively stretching the calf and plantar fascia during sleep.

Surgery
Plantar fasciotomy is a surgical treatment and the last resort for refractory plantar fasciitis pain. If plantar fasciitis does not resolve after six months of conservative treatment, then the procedure is considered as a last resort. Minimally invasive and endoscopic approaches to plantar fasciotomy exist but require a specialist who is familiar with specific equipment. The availability of these surgical techniques is limited as of 2012. A 2012 study found 76% of people who underwent endoscopic plantar fasciotomy had complete relief of their symptoms and had few complications (level IV evidence). Heel spur removal during plantar fasciotomy does not appear to improve the surgical outcome.

Plantar heel pain may occur for multiple reasons. In select cases, surgeons may perform a release of the lateral plantar nerve alongside the plantar fasciotomy. Possible complications of plantar fasciotomy include nerve injury, instability of the medial longitudinal arch of the foot, fracture of the calcaneus, prolonged recovery time, infection, rupture of the plantar fascia, and failure to improve the pain. Coblation surgery has recently been proposed as an alternative surgical approach for the treatment of recalcitrant plantar fasciitis.

Unproven treatments
Botulinum toxin A injections as well as similar techniques such as platelet-rich plasma injections and prolotherapy remain controversial.

Dry needling is also being researched for treatment of plantar fasciitis. A systematic review of available research found limited evidence of effectiveness for this technique. The studies were reported to be inadequate in quality and too diverse in methodology to enable reaching a firm conclusion.

Epidemiology
Plantar fasciitis is the most common type of plantar fascia injury and is the most common reason for heel pain, responsible for 80% of cases. The condition tends to occur more often in women, military recruits, older athletes, dancers, people with obesity, and young male athletes.

Plantar fasciitis is estimated to affect 1 in 10 people at some point during their lifetime and most commonly affects people between 40 and 60 years of age. In the United States alone, more than two million people receive treatment for plantar fasciitis. The cost of treating plantar fasciitis in the United States is estimated to be $284 million each year.

References

Further reading

External links 
 

Articles containing video clips
Disorders of fascia
Foot diseases
Fasciitis, plantar
Overuse injuries
Wikipedia emergency medicine articles ready to translate
Soft tissue disorders
Wikipedia medicine articles ready to translate